Events in chess in 2006:

Events

May
May 5 – The world's oldest living Grandmaster, Andor Lilienthal, celebrates his 95th birthday.  In his career Lilienthal played World Champions Emanuel Lasker, José Raúl Capablanca, Alexander Alekhine, and Mikhail Botvinnik.

October 
Vladimir Kramnik (Russia) defeats Veselin Topalov (Bulgaria) in the 2006 World Championship title unification match to become undisputed world champion.

December
December 26 – The All India Chess Federation imposes a ten-year ban on Umakant Sharma for using a Bluetooth device sewn into his cap to gain assistance from a chess computer during a FIDE rated tournament in Delhi.
December 29 – 44th Indian Chess Championship (National "A" Championship) in Atul won by GM Surya Shekhar Ganguly for the fourth consecutive year with the score 9/13.  The tournament format was changed to a 13-round Swiss instead of the 22 player round-robin used previously.
December 30 – Iranian Chess Championship in Tehran won by GM Ehsan Ghaem Maghami at 8.5/11.  The women's champion is WGM Shadi Paridar scoring 9.5/11.

Titles awarded

Grandmasters
In 2006 FIDE awarded the title of Grandmaster to the following players:

Bassem Amin (b. 1988) 
Levan Aroshidze (b. 1985) 
David Arutinian (b. 1984) 
Valeriy Aveskulov (b. 1986) 
Pascal Charbonneau (b. 1983) 
Paweł Czarnota (b. 1988) 
Chakkravarthy Deepan (b. 1987) 
Dzhakay Dzhakaev (b. 1980) 
Grzegorz Gajewski (b. 1985) 
José González García (b. 1973) 
Andrey Gutov (b. 1978) 
Gennadij Ginsburg (b. 1971) 
Bartłomiej Heberla (b. 1985) 
Peter Horvath (b. 1972) 
Alojzije Janković (b. 1983) 
Radosław Jedynak (b. 1982) 
Zoran Jovanović (b. 1979) 

Meelis Kanep (b. 1983) 
Melikset Khachiyan (b. 1970) 
Ibragim Khamrakulov (b. 1982) 
Aleksandr Kharitonov (b. 1986) 
Petr Kostenko (b. 1976) 
Tigran Kotanjian (b. 1981) 
Sergei Krivoshey (b. 1971) 
Yuriy Kryvoruchko (b. 1986) 
Vitaly Kunin (b. 1983) 
Viktor Láznička (b. 1988) 
Quang Liem Le (b. 1991) 
Constantin Lupulescu (b. 1984) 
Nidjat Mamedov (b. 1985) 
Mikulas Manik (b. 1975) 
Andrei Murariu (b. 1986) 
Das Neelotpal (b. 1982) 
Magesh Panchanathan (b. 1983) 

Eugene Perelshteyn (b. 1980) 
Reefat Bin-Sattar (b. 1974) 
Davor Rogic (b. 1971) 
Andrey Rychagov (b. 1979) 
Bator Sambuev (b. 1980) 
Vasile Sanduleac (b. 1971) 
Konstantine Shanava (b. 1985) 
John Shaw (b. 1968) 
Andrey Sumets (b. 1980) 
Jurij Tihonov (b. 1978) 
Todor Todorov (b. 1974) 
Marko Tratar (b. 1974) 
Yge Visser (b. 1963) 
Jan Werle (b. 1984) 
Andrey Zhigalko (b. 1985) 
Zhou Jianchao (b. 1988) 
Yaroslav Zinchenko (b. 1987)

Woman Grandmaster
In 2006 FIDE awarded the title Woman Grandmaster to the following players:

Evgeniya Doluhanova (b. 1984) 
Marina Guseva (b. 1986) 
Anastasia Gutsko (b. 1985) 
Sopio Gvetadze (b. 1983) 
Thi Bao Tram Hoang (b. 1987) 
Beata Kądziołka (b. 1986) 

Julia Kochetkova (b. 1981) 
Tatiana Kostiuk (b. 1982) 
Liubov Kostiukova (b. 1983) 
Lija Kucherova (b. 1986) 
Naira Movsisian (b. 1977) 
Jessica Nill (b. 1979) 

Niina Sammalvuo (b. 1971) 
Anna Sharevich (b. 1985) 
Shen Yang (b. 1989) 
Elena Tairova (1991–2010) 
Carmen Voicu (b. 1981)

Births
March 13 – Leon Luke Mendonca
May 29 – Gukesh D

Deaths
January 15 – Herbert Avram (1913–2006), 92, United States.
May 13 – Ratmir Kholmov (1925–2006), 80, Soviet/Russian Grandmaster.
May 13 – Burt Hochberg (1933–2006), 73, chess writer and editor, editor of Chess Life.
May 20 – Wolfgang Unzicker (1925–2006), 80, German Grandmaster, "world champion of amateurs".
July 2 – René Letelier (1915–2006), 91, Chilean International Master.
July 14 – Aleksander Wojtkiewicz (1963–2006), 43, Polish Grandmaster.
July 23 – Rudolf Teschner (1922–2006), 84, German Grandmaster and chess writer.
July 26 – Jessie Gilbert (1987–2006), 19, English Woman FIDE Master.
August 14 – Adriaan de Groot (1914–2006), 92, Dutch chess master and psychologist.
November 29 – Krystyna Hołuj-Radzikowska (1931–2006), 75, Polish Woman Grandmaster.
December 5 – David Bronstein (1924–2006), 82, Soviet/Ukrainian Grandmaster and renowned chess writer, challenger in the 1951 World Championship match.

References

 
21st century in chess
Chess by year